The Maryland Terrapins women's volleyball team is currently coached by Adam Hughes, who began in 2018.

Year by year highlights

1987–2008
Maryland volleyball began in 1983. After a few years, the program was led by future great Janice Kruger. Kruger led the Terps to back-to-back ACC titles in 2004 and 2005, as well as upsets over the following teams: on 10/16/93, #17 Florida State, 9/29/95 #22 Georgia Tech, 10/4/96 #22 Georgia Tech, 8/30/97 #14 Ohio State, 10/21/01 #25 North Carolina, 11/1/03 #4 Georgia Tech, 11/23/03 #6 Georgia Tech. Maryland volleyball head coach Janice Kruger's career accomplishments have reached an apex in recent years: five ACC titles, seven trips to the NCAA Tournament, five ACC and AVCA Region Coach of the Year honors and the top spot among all-time winningest coaches in ACC Volleyball history.

Kruger boasts an impressive .652 overall winning percentage since the 2003 season. After winning the ACC Championship in 2004 with an 18–15 season record, the Terps improved to 28–5 in 2005 to win their third-consecutive ACC Championship and advanced to the second round of the NCAA Tournament for the third straight year. Maryland eased past Kentucky in the first round of the 2005 NCAA's, before dropping a close contest to Louisville.

The AVCA named Kruger the East Region Coach of the Year in 2005, marking the fifth time she won the award. In 2003, Kruger was named the Atlantic Coast Conference Coach of the Year after leading Maryland to the ACC Championship. Kruger became the ACC's all-time winningest coach that year and now, heading into the 2007 season, ranks first in conference history with 363 victories at Maryland.

With 738 career victories, Kruger has built a powerful program in College Park that includes ACC titles in 1990, 1996, 2003, 2004, 2005 and trips to the NCAA Tournament in 1990, 1995, 1996, 1997, 2003, 2004 and 2005. Kruger's success has not gone without notice, as she has been named both the ACC and AVCA District/Region Coach of the Year in 1990, 1996, 1997, 2003 and 2005. During her coaching career, Kruger has amassed a stellar 363–235 record in College Park.

2008–2013
Over his four seasons at Maryland, Tim Horsmon continually recruited top talent to College Park with two players, Mary Cushman (2010) and Adreene Elliott (2011), earning ACC-All Freshman honors. In addition, Horsmon's last four recruiting classes all received Highest Honorable Mention honors from PrepVolleyball.com. In 2010, the Terps narrowly missed out on their first trip to the NCAA tournament in five years. That season the squad finished with 19 victories including two top-25 wins over Duke and Florida State, respectively. Horsmon's tenure at Maryland was marked with continual staff turnover and sub-par performance which ultimately led to his dismissal from the program.

2014–2017
In his first season with the Terps, Steve Aird led Maryland to a 6–0 start, the program's best since 2005. As he helped guide his team through the Terps’ most difficult schedule, and their first in the Big Ten, Aird also increased support and interest through the community. In 2014, Maryland averaged 1,539 fans per match in College Park, a dramatic increase from the 336 average the season before. In Aird's first season, the Terps set four of the top-10 attendance records in Maryland history, including the No. 1 attendance record (4,522 vs. Penn State, Oct. 23).

Under Aird's direction, Maryland earned its first-ever Big Ten win in a nationally televised match over Rutgers on the Big Ten Network. The Terps showed continual improvement throughout the season as the team took set wins over No. 15 Purdue, No. 18 Ohio State and No. 11 Nebraska.

2018–Present
On January 23, 2018, Adam Hughes was named the fifth head coach of Maryland Volleyball. <http://www.umterps.com/ViewArticle.dbml?DB_OEM_ID=29700&ATCLID=211693993></ref>

Historical Statistics
*Statistics through 2015 season

Seasons

See also
List of NCAA Division I women's volleyball programs

References

External links